Harriet Louise Keeler (1846–1921) was an American teacher, botanist, and author of several plant identification guides and textbooks. She authored 11 books, and the Harriet Keeler Memorial Woods in the Brecksville Reservation are named in her honor.

References

External links
 

American women botanists
1846 births
1921 deaths